Mohammad Wasim Naeem (born 1 December 1975) is a Pakistani former cricketer. He played in 19 first-class and 36 List A matches between 1997 and 2010. He made his Twenty20 debut on 27 April 2005, for Karachi Zebras in the 2004–05 National Twenty20 Cup.

References

External links
 

1975 births
Living people
Pakistani cricketers
Defence Housing Authority cricketers
Karachi cricketers
Karachi Zebras cricketers
Karachi Dolphins cricketers
Karachi Whites cricketers
State Bank of Pakistan cricketers
Cricketers from Karachi